Karakashian or Karakashyan  (Armenian: Կարակաշյան) is an Armenian surname that may refer to:
Narine Karakashian (born 1971), Armenian chess player
Verkine Karakashian (1856 - 1933), Ottoman-Armenian actress and soprano
Yeranuhi Karakashian (1848 - 1924), Ottoman-Armenian actress
Nonna Karakashyan (born 1940), Armenian chess player

Armenian-language surnames